The District of Columbia Public Library (DCPL) is the public library system for Washington, D.C.. The system includes 26 individual libraries including Martin Luther King Jr. Memorial Library, DCPL's central library.

History

The library was founded in 1896 by an act of Congress after a lobbying effort by Theodore W. Noyes, editor of the Washington Evening Star newspaper. Noyes served on the library's board of trustees for 50 years.

The first library branch was located in a home at 1326 New York Avenue NW, with a collection of 15,000 donated books and an appropriation of $6,720 for its maintenance.

This was replaced by a main library, donated by Andrew Carnegie, built at Mount Vernon Square, which now houses the Historical Society of Washington, D.C. and an Apple Store.  President Theodore Roosevelt attended the dedication of this building in 1903. Several of the branch libraries still in use were also built with funds donated by Carnegie.

In 1972, the main library was replaced by a Ludwig Mies van der Rohe-designed building dedicated as a memorial to Martin Luther King Jr.

Governance
DCPL is an independent agency of the District of Columbia government, managed by a Chief Librarian that is selected and reviewed by a Board of Library Trustees. The Board of Library Trustees are appointed by the Mayor of the District of Columbia, subject to review and approval by the Council of the District of Columbia.  The budget is also determined by the Council of the District of Columbia based on a request submitted by the Mayor as part of the annual  budget process for the entire government. The United States Congress also has to approve of the District's budget as a part of their oversight of the District of Columbia as the nation's capital.

The Chief Librarian is often invited to attend the Mayor's Cabinet meetings and works closely with the District Administrator on how to execute the DCPL budget. The District's Chief Financial Officer provides a fiscal officer  from that office to ensure that financial practices within DCPL meet with District requirements. DCPL also has independent procurement authority, allowing them to execute contracts for books, electronic resources, furniture, equipment, and construction services.

In addition to the Board of Library Trustees, the Council of the District of Columbia provides oversight for DCPL via a Council Committee on Education. The DC Council routinely has Performance Oversight and Budget hearings for the D.C. libraries annually.

Law enforcement
The DCPL has its own small police force, the District of Columbia Public Library Police. The Library Police's duties and mission is similar to District of Columbia Protective Services Division: to protect government property, staff, and the public. The types of incidents that occur are thefts, assaults, destruction of property, and so on.

Books from Birth 
The D.C. Public Library runs a program called Books from Birth.  The program is for children aged newborn to 5.  All enrolled children receive a book in the mail every month.   All children who live in the District are eligible.  The program runs in partnership with Imagination Library, a nonprofit run by singer Dolly Parton's Dollywood Foundation.  The D.C. program launched in 2016, and as of November 2017, 57 percent of eligible children are enrolled (27,000 children).

Branches

 Anacostia Neighborhood Library
 Bellevue / William O. Lockridge Library
 Benning / Dorothy I. Height Neighborhood Library
 Capitol View Neighborhood Library
 Chevy Chase Neighborhood Library
 Cleveland Park Neighborhood Library
 Deanwood Neighborhood Library
 Francis A. Gregory Neighborhood Library
Georgetown Neighborhood Library
 Juanita E. Thornton/Shepherd Park Neighborhood Library
 Lamond-Riggs Neighborhood Library
 Martin Luther King Jr. Memorial Library (DCPL's central library)
 Mount Pleasant Library
 Northeast Neighborhood Library
 Northwest One Library
 Palisades Neighborhood Library
 Parklands-Turner Neighborhood Library
 Petworth Neighborhood Library
 Rosedale Neighborhood Library
 Southeast Neighborhood Library
 Southwest Neighborhood Library
 Takoma Park Neighborhood Library
 Tenley-Friendship Neighborhood Library
 Watha T. Daniel/Shaw Neighborhood Library
 West End Neighborhood Library
 Woodridge Neighborhood Library

Non-resident privileges

The District of Columbia Public library issues library cards without charge to non-residents who work in, pay property taxes to, or go to school in the District of Columbia. It also will issue them to residents of jurisdictions that will reciprocate for District of Columbia residents, this includes residents of Montgomery and Prince George's Counties in Maryland, as well as residents of the cities of Alexandria, Fairfax, and Falls Church, and Arlington, Fairfax, Frederick, Loudoun and Prince William counties in Virginia. Residents of other areas not otherwise qualifying may obtain a card for $20 a year.

Nearby Public Library Systems
 Alexandria Public Library
 Arlington Public Library
 Fairfax County Public Library
 Montgomery County Public Libraries
 Prince George's County Memorial Library System

See also

 Culture of Washington, D.C.
 Library of Congress
 Public libraries in Washington, D.C.
 Martin Luther King Jr. Memorial Library
 Library system
 District of Columbia Public Library Police

References

External links

 
 DCPL Foundation
 Federation of Friends of the DC Public Library

Library
Public libraries in Washington, D.C.
1896 establishments in Washington, D.C.